Bete is a 1986 Indian Kannada action film produced and directed by V. Somashekar for Vajragiri Films who also co-wrote the screenplay along with Somu and Shanmugha Sundaram for a story by N. K. Keerthi Raj with cinematography handled by H. G. Raju and editing done by Victor Yadav duo starring Ambareesh, Ambika, Anuradha, Umashree, T. N. Balakrishna, Vajramuni and Mukhyamantri Chandru in the major roles. The film received a U/A Certificate from the Bangalore regional office of the censor board, the certificate dated 6/11/1986 with 9 cuts.

Cast 
 Ambareesh
 Ambika
 Anuradha
 Umashree
 T. N. Balakrishna
 Vajramuni
 Mukhyamantri Chandru
 Dheerendra Gopal
 C. R. Simha
 Sudheer
 N. S. Rao
 Thimmaraya
 Lohithaswa

Guest Appearance 
 Srinath
 Thoogudeepa Srinivas
 Jai Jagadish
 Manu
 Suma
 Thara

Soundtrack 
S. P. B. scored and composed the film's soundtrack with lyrics penned by R. N. Jayagopal.
 Shlokam by S. P. B.
 Chaliya Naduke by S. P. B., S. Janaki
 Chintisune Manave by S. P. B.
 Bete Bete by S. P. B.
 Anda Chandadali by S. Janaki
 Hathu Yenthu by S. P. Sailaja, Uma Ramanan
 Abbabba Yentha by S. Janaki

References

External links 
Bete at Gaana

1986 films
1986 action films
Indian action films
Films directed by V. Somashekhar
Films scored by S. P. Balasubrahmanyam
1980s Kannada-language films